John Hogan may refer to:

John Hogan (executive) (born before 1970), American corporate executive
John Hogan (footballer) (born 1941), Australian rules footballer
John Hogan (mathematician) (born 1954), British academic
John Hogan (Missouri politician) (1805–1892), Irish-American preacher and politician
John Hogan (Newfoundland and Labrador politician), member of the Newfoundland and Labrador House of Assembly
John Hogan (North Carolina planter) (1740–1810), American Revolutionary War soldier and politician
John Hogan (rugby) (1881–1945), New Zealand dual-international
John Hogan (sculptor) (1800–1858), Irish sculptor, creator of The Dead Christ
John Hogan (singer) (born 1953), Irish singer
John Hogan (VC) (1884–1943), English First World War soldier and recipient of the Victoria Cross
John Baptist Hogan (1829–1901), Irish-French Catholic theologian and educator
John D. Hogan (born 1939), American psychologist and author
John F. Hogan (1858–1918), Irish priest and educator
John Forbes Hogan (1894–1967), American architect
John Joseph Hogan (1829–1913), American Roman Catholic bishop
J. Paul Hogan (1919–2012), American chemist, inventor of polyethylene
John Sheridan Hogan (c.1815–1859), journalist, lawyer and political figure in Canada West
John Vincent Lawless Hogan (1890–1960), American electrical engineer responsible for early advances in radio broadcasting technology
John W. Hogan (1853–1926), American associate appellate judge and lawyer

See also
Jack Hogan (born 1929), American actor
Jonathan Hogan (born 1951), American actor